Bossiaea obcordata, commonly known as spiny bossiaea, is a species of flowering plant in the family Fabaceae and is endemic to south-eastern continental Australia. It is an erect, rigid shrub with spiny branches, heart-shaped to egg-shaped with the narrower end towards the base, and yellow and purplish-brown flowers.

Description

Taxonomy
Spiny bossiaea was first formally described in 1804 by Étienne Pierre Ventenat who gave it the name Platylobium obcordatum in his book, Le Jardin de la Malmaison. In 1917, George Claridge Druce changed the name to Bossia obcordata and the new name is accepted by the Australian Plant Census. The specific epithet (obcordata) refers to the obcordate shape of the leaves.

Distribution and habitat
Bossiaea obcordata grows in forest and heath, often on dry sandstone ridges and slopes. It is found from far south-eastern Queensland through the coast, western slopes and tablelands of eastern New South Wales, to central and eastern Victoria. Specimens recorded from Tasmania are now included in Bossiaea tasmanica.

References

obcordata
Mirbelioids
Flora of New South Wales
Flora of Queensland
Flora of Victoria (Australia)
Taxa named by Étienne Pierre Ventenat
Plants described in 1804